Pothuhera is a small town located in Kurunegala District, Sri Lanka.

Transport
Pothuhera is located on the A6 (Ambepussa-Trincomallee) road.

Pothuhera is situated on the Northern Line and has a railway station, which serves as a stop for trains going from Colombo to Jaffna and Batticaloa.

Commerce
Branches from the following banks are located in Pothuhera: People's Bank, Bank of Ceylon, Regional Development Bank and Sanasa Bank.

Populated places in North Western Province, Sri Lanka
Populated places in Kurunegala District
Grama Niladhari divisions of Sri Lanka